The Single Euro Payments Area (SEPA) is a payment-integration initiative of the European Union for simplification of bank transfers denominated in euro. , there were 36 members in SEPA, consisting of the 27 member states of the European Union, the four member states of the European Free Trade Association (Iceland, Liechtenstein, Norway and Switzerland), and the United Kingdom. Some microstates participate in the technical schemes: Andorra, Monaco, San Marino, and Vatican City.

SEPA covers predominantly normal bank transfers. Payment methods which have additional optional features or services, such as mobile phone or smart card payment systems, are not directly covered. However, the instant SEPA payment scheme facilitates payment products also on smart devices.

Goals 
The aim of SEPA is to improve the efficiency of cross-border payments and turn the previously fragmented national markets for euro payments into a single domestic one.  SEPA enables customers to make cashless euro payments to any account located anywhere in the area, using a single bank account and a single set of payment instruments. People who have a bank account in a eurozone country can use it to receive salaries and make payments all over the eurozone, for example when they take a job in a new country.

The project includes the development of common financial instruments, standards, procedures, and infrastructure to enable economies of scale. This should, in turn, reduce the overall cost to the European economy of moving capital around the region (estimated as 2-3% of total GDP).

SEPA does not cover payments in currencies other than the euro. This means that domestic payments in SEPA countries not using the euro will continue to use local schemes, but cross-border payments will use SEPA and the euro with eurozone countries to a high degree.

The Nordic countries (other than Finland) do not use the euro and have no plans to adopt the euro. These four countries (Sweden, Denmark, Norway, and Iceland) started initiatives during 2017-2019 for simpler, faster, and cheaper cross-border payments between one another.

Schemes 

The different functionalities provided by SEPA are divided into separate payment schemes.

SEPA Credit Transfer (SCT) allows for the transfer of funds from one bank account to another. SEPA clearing rules require that payments made before the cutoff point on a working day be credited to the recipient's account by the next working day.

SEPA Instant Credit Transfer (SCT Inst), also called SEPA Instant Payment, provides for instant crediting of a payee, the delay being less than ten seconds, initially, with a maximum of twenty seconds in exceptional circumstances. This scheme was launched in November 2017, and was at that time operational for end customers in eight euro zone countries, and is expected soon to be available in most euro zone countries and potentially in all SEPA countries.

Direct debit functionality is provided by two separate schemes. The basic scheme, Core SDD, is primarily targeted at consumers and was launched on 2 November 2009. Banks offering SEPA payments are obliged to participate in this scheme. A second scheme, B2B SDD, is targeted towards business users. Banks offering SEPA payments are not obliged to participate in this scheme (participation is optional). Among the differences with respect to Core SDD:

 It requires a mandate to be submitted to the bank by both the creditor and debtor.
 It does not allow the debtor to request a refund from its bank after its account has been debited.

Coverage 
SEPA consists of 36 countries:

 The 27 member states of the European Union, including
 the 20 states that are in the Eurozone:
Austria, Belgium, Croatia, Cyprus, Estonia, Finland, France, Germany, Greece, Ireland, Italy, Latvia, Lithuania, Luxembourg, Malta, the Netherlands, Portugal, Slovakia, Slovenia, Spain
 the 7 states that are not in the Eurozone:
Bulgaria, the Czech Republic, Denmark, Hungary, Poland, Romania, Sweden.
 The four member states of the European Free Trade Association
 the three states having signed the European Economic Area agreement:
Iceland, Liechtenstein, Norway.
 the one EFTA member that has not joined the EEA, but instead has a series of bilateral agreements with the EU:
Switzerland.
Four microstates which have monetary agreements with the EU:
 Andorra, Monaco, San Marino, Vatican City.
 The United Kingdom, which has withdrawn from the European Union, but will continue to participate in SEPA payment schemes as a non-member with exceptions, such as BIC required.
 Gibraltar and the Crown dependencies (Guernsey, Jersey and the Isle of Man) are part of SEPA.

All parts of a country are normally part of SEPA. However, the following countries have special territories which are not part of SEPA:

 Cyprus: Northern Cyprus is excluded.
 Denmark: the Faroe Islands and Greenland are excluded.
 France: the French Southern and Antarctic Lands, French Polynesia, New Caledonia and Wallis and Futuna are excluded. Nevertheless, the last three are part of SEPA COM Pacifique.
 Netherlands: Aruba, the Caribbean Netherlands, Curaçao and Sint Maarten are excluded.
 Norway: Svalbard and Jan Mayen are excluded.
 United Kingdom: British Overseas Territories are excluded, except for Gibraltar and the Crown dependencies.

Jurisdictions using the euro that are not in SEPA: Akrotiri and Dhekelia, French Southern and Antarctic Lands, Kosovo, and Montenegro.

Jurisdictions in Europe not formally belonging to SEPA normally use SEPA schemes anyway for international euro payments, especially to or from the eurozone, with exceptions such as fees charged and BIC required.

Charges 
SEPA guarantees that euro payments are received within a guaranteed time, and banks are not allowed to make any deductions of the amount transferred, introduced by a regulation in 2001. Banks and payment institutions still have the option of charging a credit-transfer fee of their choice for euro transfers if it is charged uniformly to all EEA participants, banks or payment institutions, domestic or foreign. This is relevant for countries which do not use the euro; where domestic transfers in euros by consumers are uncommon, and inflated fees for euro transfers might be charged in these states. Sweden and Denmark have legislated that euro transfers shall be charged the same as transfers in their own currency; which has the effect of giving free euro ATM withdrawals, but charges for ATM withdrawals in other currencies used in the EU.

In regulation (EC) 924/2009 (the Cross-border Payments Regulation), the European Parliament mandated that charges in respect of cross-border payments in euros (of up to EUR 50,000) between EU member states shall be the same as the charges for corresponding payments within the member state. However, the EU Regulation does not apply to all SEPA countries; the most significant difference is the inclusion of Switzerland in SEPA but not the EU. The rule of the same price applies even if the transaction is sent as an international transaction instead of a SEPA transaction (common before 2008, or if any involved bank does not support SEPA transactions). Regulation 924/2009 does not regulate charges for currency conversion so charges for non-euro transactions can still be applied (if not banned by national law).

History
There were two milestones in the establishment of SEPA:
 Pan-European payment instruments for credit transfers began on 28 January 2008; direct debits and debit cards became available in November 2009.
 By the end of 2010, all former national payment infrastructures and payment processors were expected to be in full competition to increase efficiency through consolidation and economies of scale.

For direct debits, the first milestone was missed due to a delay in the implementation of enabling legislation (the Payment Services Directive or PSD) in the European Parliament. Direct debits became available in November 2009, which put time pressure on the second milestone.

The European Commission has established the legal foundation through the PSD. The commercial and technical frameworks for payment instruments were developed by the European Payments Council (EPC), made up of European banks. The EPC is committed to delivering three pan-European payment instruments:
 Credit transfers: SCT – SEPA Credit Transfer
 Direct debits: SDD – SEPA Direct Debit. Banks began offering this service on 2 November 2009.
 Cards: SEPA Cards Framework

To provide end-to-end automated direct payment processing for SEPA-clearing, the EPC committed to delivering technical validation subsets of ISO 20022. Whereas bank-to-bank messages (pacs) are mandatory for use, customer-to-bank payment initialization (PAIN) message types are not; however, they are strongly recommended. Because there is room for interpretation, it is expected that several PAIN specifications will be published in SEPA countries.

Businesses, merchants, consumers and governments are also interested in the development of SEPA. The European Associations of Corporate Treasurers (EACT), TWIST, the European Central Bank, the European Commission, the European Payments Council, the European Automated Clearing House Association (EACHA), payments processors and pan-European banking associations – European Banking Federation (EBF), European Association of Co-operative Banks (EACB) and the European Savings Banks Group (ESBG) – are playing an active role in defining the services which SEPA will deliver.

Since January 2008, banks have been switching customers to the new payment instruments. By 2010, the majority were expected to be on the SEPA framework. As a result, banks throughout the SEPA area (not just the Eurozone) need to invest in technology with the capacity to support SEPA payment instruments.

SEPA clearance is based on the International Bank Account Numbers (IBAN). Domestic euro transactions are routed by IBAN; earlier national-designation schemes were abolished by February 2014, providing uniform access to the new payment instruments. Since February 2016 Eurozone payment system users no longer require BIC sorting information for SEPA transactions; it is automatically derived from the IBAN for all banks in the SEPA area.

An instant 24/7/365 payment scheme named SCT Inst went live on 21 November 2017 allowing instant payment 24 hours a day and 365 days a year.
The participating banks will handle the user interface and security, like for existing SEPA payments, e.g. web sites and mobile apps.

Key dates

Uptake 
As of August 2014, 99.4% of credit transfers, 99.9% of direct debit, and 79.2% of card payments have been migrated to SEPA in the euro area.

The official progress report was published in March 2013.

In October 2010, the European Central Bank published its seventh progress report on SEPA. The European Central Bank regards SEPA as an essential element to advance the usability and maturity of the euro.

See also 
 European Union law
 Giro
 European Payments Union
 Instrument in Support of Trade Exchanges (INSTEX)
 Creditor Reference
 ISO 20022
 Payment Services Directive
 Society for Worldwide Interbank Financial Telecommunication (SWIFT)
 SPFS

References 

Banking in the European Union
European Economic Area
European Union financial market policy
Payment systems